Ayanavaram taluk is a taluk of the village in Chennai in the Indian state of Tamil Nadu. It was formed in December 2013 from parts of the erstwhile Perambur-Purasawalkam taluk. It comprises the neighbourhoods of Ayanavaram, Kolathur and Peravallur.

References

General
 Taluks of Chennai district

Specific

Taluks of Chennai district